Armindo Rodrigues Mendes Furtado (born 16 November 1987), commonly known as Brito, is a professional footballer. Born in Portugal, he played for the Cape Verde national team.

Career
On 18 July 2017 Greek Superleague club Xanthi announced the signing of Brito. He made his debut against Lamia in 0-0 home draw on 19 August 2017. One week later he scored his first goal in 2-0 away win against Platanias. On 15 October 2017 he scored with a marvellous free-kick against AEK Athens in a 1-1 home draw. A few days later the club's administration extended his contract for 2 years. On 4 November he scored a brace in a 3-1 away win against Panetolikos.

His first goal for the 2018-19 season came in a home game against PAS Giannina, which ended as a 2-1 win.

On 30 June 2019 Brito signed a contract with Romania's club, Dinamo București. He was released on 30 January 2020.

References

External links
 
 
 

1987 births
Living people
People from Moita
Cape Verdean footballers
Cape Verde international footballers
Portuguese footballers
Portuguese people of Cape Verdean descent
Citizens of Cape Verde through descent
Association football forwards
C.R.D. Libolo players
Xanthi F.C. players
FC Dinamo București players
Girabola players
Super League Greece players
Liga I players
Sertanense F.C. players
S.C.U. Torreense players
Gil Vicente F.C. players
Boavista F.C. players
C.S. Marítimo players
Associação Académica de Coimbra – O.A.F. players
Campeonato de Portugal (league) players
Primeira Liga players
Liga Portugal 2 players
Segunda Divisão players
Cape Verdean expatriate footballers
Cape Verdean expatriate sportspeople in Angola
Expatriate footballers in Angola
Cape Verdean expatriate sportspeople in Greece
Expatriate footballers in Greece
Cape Verdean expatriate sportspeople in Romania
Expatriate footballers in Romania
Portuguese expatriate footballers
Portuguese expatriate sportspeople in Angola
Portuguese expatriate sportspeople in Greece
Portuguese expatriate sportspeople in Romania
Portuguese sportspeople of Cape Verdean descent
Sportspeople from Setúbal District